This article lists the largest companies in China in terms of their revenue, net profit and total assets, according to the American business magazines Fortune and Forbes. In 2022, Fortune'''s Global 500 list of the world's largest corporations included 145 Chinese companies in total. Over the same year, Forbes reported that three of the world's ten largest public companies were Chinese, including the world's largest bank by total assets, the Industrial and Commercial Bank of China. Many of China's largest companies are state-owned enterprises, due to the significant presence of the Chinese government in the national economy.

2022 Fortune Global 500 List
This list details the twenty five largest Chinese companies according to the Fortune Global 500, which ranks the world's largest companies by annual revenue. The figures below are given in millions of US dollars and are for their respective fiscal year ending on or before 31 March 2022. Also listed for each company are the location of its headquarters, their primary industry and their number of employees, in addition to ownership characteristics.

2022 Forbes Global 2000 List
This list details the twenty five largest Chinese companies according to the Forbes Global 2000, which ranks the world's 2,000 largest publicly traded companies. The Forbes'' list takes into account a multitude of factors, assigning an equal weighting to revenue, profit, assets and market value. The figures are given in billions of US dollars and are for the trailing twelve months up to 22 April 2022. Also listed for each company are the location of its headquarters and their primary industry.

See also
List of companies of China
List of largest companies by revenue

References

External links
 Jones, L. (2020), Beyond China Inc., Understanding Chinese companies (Transnational Institute)

China
China, largest
Companies
Lists of companies of China